The 1995 Tampa Bay Storm season was the ninth season for the Tampa Bay Storm. They finished the 1995 Arena Football League season 10–2 and ended the season with a win in ArenaBowl IX against the Orlando Predators.

Schedule

Regular season

Playoffs
The Storm were awarded the No. 1 overall seed in the AFL playoffs as a result of their league-best regular season record.

Standings

Awards

References

Tampa Bay Storm seasons
1995 Arena Football League season
Tampa Bay Storm Season, 1995
ArenaBowl champion seasons